Woodlands or Woodlands School was a hospital in New Westminster, British Columbia, Canada that served as a psychiatric hospital and later as a facility for children with a developmental disorder, as well as runaways and wards of the state. Many incidents of abuse took place there.

Woodlands opened in 1878 as the Provincial Lunatic Asylum. In 1897 the name was changed to The Provincial Hospital for the Insane. In 1950 the name was changed again to Woodlands School. Woodlands closed in 1996.

The site of the former school was also considered for a station on the Expo Line portion of the SkyTrain system. However, plans to redevelop the site never materialized before the construction of the station, meaning that even though the tracks were built to accommodate the new station, it was never built. The neighborhood has since been renamed Victoria Hill, and is home to 1200 new homes.

After proposals to preserve Woodlands' Centre Block Tower were opposed by former residents, New Westminster council voted in July 2011 to demolish the tower.

Similar facilities elsewhere in British Columbia included Tranquille in Kamloops, Essondale or Riverview Hospital in Coquitlam, and Valleyview, also in Coquitlam.

References

External links

Hospital buildings completed in 1878
Government buildings completed in 1878
Psychiatric hospitals in Canada
Hospitals in British Columbia
1996 disestablishments in British Columbia
Buildings and structures in New Westminster